The 1988 Espirito Santo Trophy took place 8–11 September at Drottningholm Golf Club in Stockholm, Sweden. The club was later renamed the Royal Drottningholm Golf Club, named from the palace close to the course, the Drottningholm Palace, home of the Swedish king and queen. The course, laid out on crown property, opened in 1959 in a park and woodland area about 15 kilometres (9 miles) from midtown Stockholm. For this championship, the course was set up as the women's championship course with par 73.

It was the 13th women's golf World Amateur Team Championship for the Espirito Santo Trophy. The tournament was a 72-hole stroke play team event with 27 team entries, each with three players. The best two scores for each round counted towards the team total.

The United States team won the Trophy, earning the title for the tenth time, beating the hosting country team Sweden by one stroke. Sweden earned the silver medal while the combined team of Great Britain & Ireland took the bronze on third place another twelve strokes back.

Anne Quast Sander, playing in the United States team, was a member of the winning team for a tied record third time, in 1988 at 51 years of age and 24 years after her first win in 1966 (at the time known as Anne Quast Welts). Her second win came in 1968. The only other women to have won the Espirito Santo Trophy three times is Jane Bastanchury Booth, who was a member of the winning U.S. team in 1968, 1970 and 1972.

Teams 
27 teams entered the event and completed the competition. Each team had three players.

Results 

Sources:

Individual leaders 
There was no official recognition for the lowest individual scores.

References

External links 
World Amateur Team Championships on International Golf Federation website

Espirito Santo Trophy
Golf tournaments in Sweden
Espirito Santo Trophy
Espirito Santo Trophy
Espirito Santo Trophy